Gregory-Portland High School is a  5A secondary school in Portland, Texas and is a part of the Gregory-Portland Independent School District in southeastern San Patricio County.   In addition to Portland, the school also serves the city of Gregory as well as the unincorporated communities of Doyle, Falman-County Acres, and Tradewinds.  The new Gregory-Portland High School was completed in the fall of 2002. The current High School is large enough (in size) to be a 6A school, capable of a student capacity of 2,400.

Academics
Gregory-Portland has been noted as a:

U.S. Department of Education Blue Ribbon School of Excellence 1999–2000.
A "Just for the Kids High-Performing School" in reading and Mathematics 2000–2002.

Theatre department

State Titles
One Act Play - 
1980(3A), 1986(4A), 1987(4A), 1989(4A), 1990(4A), 1997(4A), 2002(4A)
Welding National Champions
2021(5A), 2022(5A)

Athletics

State Titles
Girls Track - 
1981(4A), 1982(4A)
Volleyball - 
1967(2A), 1973(3A)

References

External links
 

Schools in San Patricio County, Texas
Public high schools in Texas